Eugene Aaron Huey (born July 20, 1947) is a former American football defensive back in the American Football League (AFL). He was drafted by the St. Louis Cardinals in the sixth round of the 1969 NFL Draft and also played for the San Diego Chargers. He played college football at Wyoming.

Huey served as the running backs coach for the Indianapolis Colts from 1992 to 2010, making him the longest tenured coach of any position in franchise history. His 272 games coached is also the most for an assistant in team history. He was also a coach for the Wyoming Cowboys, New Mexico Lobos, Nebraska Cornhuskers, Arizona State Sun Devils, and Ohio State Buckeyes football teams.

Coaching Timeline
 1970–1971 University of Wyoming (GA)
 1974–1975 University of New Mexico (WR)
 1976–1986 University of Nebraska (WR)
 1987 Arizona State University (WR)
 1988–1990 Ohio State University (WR)
 1991 Ohio State University (RB)
 1992–2010 Indianapolis Colts (RB)

References

External links
 Indianapolis Colts bio

1947 births
Living people
American football cornerbacks
American football safeties
American football tight ends
American football wide receivers
American Football League players
Arizona State Sun Devils football coaches
Indianapolis Colts coaches
Nebraska Cornhuskers football coaches
New Mexico Lobos football coaches
Ohio State Buckeyes football coaches
San Diego Chargers players
Wyoming Cowboys football coaches
Wyoming Cowboys football players
People from Uniontown, Pennsylvania
Coaches of American football from Pennsylvania
Players of American football from Pennsylvania